Fatma Sultan may refer to:
Fatma Sultan (daughter of Murad II) (1430–?), Ottoman princess
Fatma Sultan (daughter of Bayezid II) (1468–?), Ottoman princess
Hançerli Fatma Sultan (1495–1533), Ottoman princess
Fatma Sultan (daughter of Selim I) (1500–1573), Ottoman princess
Fatma Sultan (daughter of Selim II) (–1580), Ottoman princess
Fatma Sultan (daughter of Murad III) (1574–1620), Ottoman princess
Fatma Sultan (daughter of Mehmed III) ( 1584–?), Ottoman princess 
Fatma Sultan (daughter of Ahmed I) (–1670), Ottoman princess
Fatma Sultan (daughter of Ibrahim) (1642–1682), Ottoman princess
Fatma Emetullah Sultan (daughter of Mehmed IV) (1680–1700), Ottoman princess
Fatma Sultan (daughter of Ahmed III) (1704–1733), Ottoman princess
Fatma Sultan (daughter of Abdulmejid I) (1840–1884), Ottoman princess
Fatma Sultan (daughter of Murad V) (1879–1932), Ottoman princess